The 1985 Ontario general election was held on May 2, 1985, to elect the members of the 33rd Legislative Assembly of Ontario, Canada. The Progressive Conservatives won the most seats but not a majority.

Shortly afterward, the 42 years of PC governance in Ontario came to an end by a confidence vote defeating Premier Frank Miller's minority government. David Peterson's Liberals then formed a minority government with the support of Bob Rae's New Democratic Party.

Prelude
Around Thanksgiving in 1984, Ontario Premier Bill Davis announced that he would be stepping down from his longtime post and as leader of the Ontario PCs in early 1985. In office since 1971, he had a string of electoral victories by pursuing a moderate agenda and by relying on the skill of the Big Blue Machine team of advisors. Davis, who remained generally popular throughout his term in office, would unveil a surprise legacy project: full funding for Ontario's separate Catholic school system, which would become known as Bill 30. That decision was supported by both other parties but was generally unpopular, especially in the PC base.

The subsequent leadership race saw the party divide into two rough camps. The moderate and mainly-urban wing was represented by the second-place finisher, Larry Grossman. The more conservative rural faction backed the eventual victor, Frank Miller.  After Miller's victory at the convention, the party's factions failed to reconcile, which was especially important since many moderate members of the Big Blue Machine were pushed aside.

Election
Despite those problems, the PCs remained far ahead in the polls, and when Miller called an election just six weeks after becoming premier, he was about 20% ahead of the Liberals. Over the campaign, the PCs lead began to shrink as the Liberals waged a highly effective campaign. During the campaign, the separate schools question re-emerged when the Anglican prelate of Toronto, Archbishop Lewis Garnsworthy, held a news conference on the issue in which he compared Davis's methods in pushing through the reform to Adolf Hitler, saying: "This is how Hitler changed education in Germany, by exactly the same process, by decree. I won't take that back." Garnsworthy was much criticized for his remarks, but the issue was revived, which alienated the PC base, some of whom chose to stay home on election day.

The election held May 2, 1985, ended in a stalemate. The PCs emerged with a much-reduced caucus of 52 seats. The Liberals won 48 seats but won slightly more of the popular vote. The NDP held the balance of power, with 25 seats. Despite taking 14 seats from the PCs, the Liberals were somewhat disappointed, as they felt that they had their first realistic chance of winning government in recent memory. The NDP was also disappointed by the election result. The party had been nearly tied with the Liberals for popular support for several years and had hoped to surpass them.

Aftermath
The incumbent PCs intended to remain in power with a minority government, as they had done on two occasions under Davis' leadership. Rae and the NDP had little interest in supporting a continuation of PC rule, while the Liberals were also more amenable to a partnership compared to in the 1970's. Among other things, the Liberals repeatedly pointed out that (again, unlike in the previous decade) their party had won the popular vote and therefore, in their view, had at least as much of a right to govern the province as the Conservatives. The NDP began negotiations on May 13 to reach an agreement with the Liberals. Rae and Peterson signed an accord on May 29 that would see a number of NDP priorities put into law in exchange for an NDP motion of non-confidence in Miller's government and the NDP's support of the Liberals. The NDP agreed to support a Liberal minority government for two years during which the Liberals agreed not to call an election.

Miller, apprised of negotiations, considered a plan to address the province on the television two days before the throne speech, disown funding for Catholic schools, and announce he was meeting with the Lieutenant Governor to request an election before a confidence vote could take place. Believing that the Lieutenant Governor would have to call an election if requested before the confidence vote, Miller refused to do so since he believed the party's finances to be too fragile for a second campaign and that repudiating a key Davis policy would tear the party apart.

In what was by then a foregone conclusion, on June 18, 1985 the PC government was defeated by the passage of a motion of no confidence introduced by Rae. Lieutenant-Governor John Black Aird then asked Peterson to form a government. Privately, Aird's actions suited Miller since even without party infighting and finances to consider, the PC's internal polling had by then clearly indicated the voters did not want another election and that even if the Lieutenant-Governor could have been convinced to call one, the Liberals would have been likely to win in a landslide. The actions of Aird, who was appointed by former Liberal Prime Minister Pierre Trudeau, therefore allowed Miller to portray his relinquishing of the premiership as a grudging acquiescence that he was forced to undertake by a representative of the sovereign, who the PC's would subsequently claim had breached constitutional convention and inappropriately engaged in partisanship to elevate his second-place party to government. In any case, Miller resigned on June 26 and Peterson's minority government was sworn in on the same day.

Results

The Revolutionary Workers League fielded one candidate.

Riding results

Algoma:

(incumbent) Bud Wildman (NDP) 7575
Jim Thibert (PC) 3694
Bryan McDougall (L) 2995

Algoma—Manitoulin:

(incumbent) John Lane (PC) 7174
Tom Farquhar (L) 4704
Len Hembruf (NDP) 3309

Armourdale:

(incumbent) Bruce McCaffrey (PC) 13394
Gino Matrundola (L) 13182
Bob Hebdon (NDP) 5429
Simon Srdarev (Lbt) 456

Beaches—Woodbine:

(incumbent) Marion Bryden (NDP) 12672
Paul Christie (PC) 7301
Sally Kelly (L) 5065
Steve Thistle (Lbt) 396

Bellwoods:

(incumbent) Ross McClellan (NDP) 8088
Walter Bardyn (L) 6655
Bento de Sao Jose (PC) 1964
Ronald Rodgers  324

Brampton:

Bob Callahan (L) 25656		
Jeff Rice (PC) 21239
Terry Gorman (NDP) 8313
Jim Bridgewood (Comm) 531
Dave Duqette  500

Brantford:

(incumbent) Phil Gillies (PC) 13444
Jack Tubman (NDP) 12303
Herb German (L) 6533

Brant—Oxford—Haldimand:

(incumbent) Robert Nixon (L) 15317
Ian Birnie (PC) 5817
Irene Heltner (NDP) 3487

Brock:

Peter Partington (PC) 9741
Bill Andres (L) 9081
Robert Woolston (NDP) 3867
Brian Dolby (G) 755

Burlington South:

Cam Jackson (PC) 16479
Doug Redfearn (L) 11822
Walter Mukewich (NDP) 10820

Cambridge:

(incumbent) Bill Barlow (PC) 12888
Alec Dufresne (NDP) 11985
Bob Jeffrey (L) 7083

Carleton:

(incumbent) Bob Mitchell (PC) 17732
Hans Daigeler (L) 15093
Bea Murray (NDP) 7165

Carleton East:

Gilles Morin (L) 23221
(incumbent) Bob MacQuarrie (PC) 16188
Joan Gullen (NDP) 8829

Carleton-Grenville:

(incumbent) Norm Sterling (PC) 15524
Dan Maxwell (L) 8019
Alan White (NDP) 3468

Chatham—Kent:

Maurice Bossy (L) 10340	
(incumbent) Andy Watson (PC) 9206
Ron Franko (NDP) 5535

Cochrane North:

René Fontaine (L) 8793
(incumbent) René Piché (PC) 6883
Andre Philippe (NDP) 2878

Cochrane South:

(incumbent) Alan Pope (PC) 13935
Roger Loiselle (NDP) 5662
Jim Martin (L) 4002

Cornwall:

Luc Guindon (PC) 9430
Claude Poirier (L) 6384
Steve Corrie (NDP) 5828

Don Mills:

(incumbent) Dennis Timbrell (PC) 15481
John Atkin (L) 7504
Michael Wyatt (NDP) 6153
Gary Watson (Ind [RWL]) 1382

Dovercourt:

(incumbent) Tony Lupusella (NDP) 6677
Gil Gillespie (L) 6600
Joe Palozzi (PC) 3564
Gordon Massie (Comm) 298

Downsview:

Joseph Cordiano (L) 11234
(incumbent) Odoardo Di Santo (NDP) 11013
Vincent Stabile (PC) 3329

Dufferin—Simcoe:

(incumbent) George McCague (PC) 16198
Gary Johnson (L) 11822
Jeff Koechlin (NDP) 4316

Durham East:

(incumbent) Sam Cureatz (PC) 15193
Doug Smith (NDP) 9832
Steve Ryan (L) 7584

Durham West:

(incumbent) George Ashe (PC) 18684
Brian Evans (L) 14348
Don Stewart (NDP) 8495
Eugene Gmitrowicz (Lbt) 911

Durham—York:

(incumbent) Ross Stevenson (PC) 14343
Don Hadden (L) 9760
Margaret Wilbur (NDP) 5440

Eglinton:

David McFadden (PC) 13503
Dianne Poole (L) 12589
John Goodfellow (NDP) 4880

Elgin:

(incumbent) Ron McNeil (PC) 11816
Peter Charlton (L) 8619
Gord Campbell (NDP) 5315

Erie:

(incumbent) Ray Haggerty (L) 10926
Stan Pettit (PC) 5904
Shirley Summers (NDP) 3191

Essex North:

Pat Hayes (NDP) 7901
Jack Morris (L) 6615
Jack Menard (PC) 6105
Ray Boggs  2925

Essex South:

(incumbent) Remo Mancini (L) 11382
Paul Setterington (PC) 5098
Jeff Totten   4947
Paul Hertel (NDP) 267

Etobicoke:

(incumbent) Ed Philip (NDP) 16792
John Smith (PC) 7573
John Genser (L) 6544

Fort William:

(incumbent) Mickey Hennessy (PC) 14452
Don Smith (NDP) 7071
Norris Badanai (L) 4629
John MacLennan (Comm) 289

Frontenac—Addington:

Larry South (L) 11684
(incumbent) J. Earl McEwen (PC) 9297
Lars Thompson (NDP) 3723
Ross Baker  941

Grey:

(incumbent) Bob McKessock (L) 16061
Case Vanderham (PC) 5875
Rhonda Green (NDP) 2402
Eric Biggins (Lbt) 306

Grey—Bruce:

(incumbent) Eddie Sargent (L) 14883
Arlene Wright (PC) 7595
Joanne Shaw (NDP) 2340

Haldimand—Norfolk:

(incumbent) Gordon Miller (L) 17456
Barbara Martindale (PC) 9863
Wayne Pierce (NDP) 3821

Halton—Burlington:

Don Knight (L) 14991
Peter Pomeroy (PC) 14777
Doug Hamilton (NDP) 4871
Neil Sivertson  665

Hamilton Centre:

Lily Oddie Munro (L) 9184
(incumbent) Mike Davison (NDP) 8800
John Ankers (PC) 2883

Hamilton East:

(incumbent) Robert W. Mackenzie (NDP) 13774
Shirley Collins (L) 12174
Fred Lombardo (PC) 5268
Kerry Wilson (Comm) 234

Hamilton Mountain:

(incumbent) Brian Charlton (NDP) 13871
Steve Oneschuk (PC) 9729
Dominic Agostino (L) 7757

Hamilton West:

(incumbent) Richard Allen (NDP) 10182
Paul Hanover (L) 9732
Anne Jones (PC) 6705
Ron Crawford  496
Val Hache  97

Hastings—Peterborough:

(incumbent) Jim Pollock (PC) 12272
Paul Ockenden (L) 5586
Elmer Buchanan (NDP) 4492

High Park—Swansea:

(incumbent) Yuri Shymko (PC) 9960
Elaine Ziemba (NDP) 9630
John Rudnicki (L) 5578
Bob Cumming (Lbt) 498
Robert Seajkowski  244
Andrew Scorer (G) 209

Humber:

Jim Henderson (L) 18057
(incumbent) Morley Kells (PC) 16106
Peter Sutherland (NDP) 5160

Huron—Bruce:

(incumbent) Murray Elston (L) 17159
Mike Snobelen (PC) 8550
Norma Peterson (NDP) 1992

Huron—Middlesex:

(incumbent) Jack Riddell (L) 13820
Bryan Smith (PC) 7381
Paul Klopp (NDP) 1148
Carmen Dawson  229

Kenora:

(incumbent) Leo Bernier (PC) 12574
Colin Wasacase (NDP) 4025
Mark Ducharme (L) 2254

Kent—Elgin:

(incumbent) Jim McGuigan (L) 11616
Shirley McHardy (PC) 7838
Donald Alexander (NDP) 1916

Kingston and the Islands:

Ken Keyes (L) 11924
(incumbent) Keith Norton (PC) 9637
Pamela Cross (NDP) 3892
Don Irvine (G) 285

Kitchener:

David Cooke (L) 14066
Don Travers (PC) 9684
Tim Little (NDP) 5654
Ed Halbach (Ind [Humanist]) 453
Albert Norris  157

Kitchener—Wilmot:

(incumbent) John Sweeney  (L) 15987
Jim Ziegler (PC) 8737
Mike Cooper (NDP) 4673	

Lake Nipigon:

Gilles Pouliot (NDP) 5708
Jim Files (PC) 4532
Michael Power (L) 3448

Lambton:

David William Smith (L) 10816
Bob Boyd (PC) 9956
Grant Reynolds (NDP) 1987

Lanark—Renfrew:

(incumbent) Douglas Wiseman (PC) 10916
John Carley (L) 5146
Don Page (NDP) 3297

Lakeshore:

Ruth Grier (NDP) 11539	
Frank Sgarlata (L) 9502
(incumbent) Al Kolyn (PC) 7886

Leeds:

(incumbent) Robert Runciman (PC) 11809
Dolores Wing (L) 6748
Bob Smith (NDP) 3583
Mackie Morrison  741

Lincoln:

(incumbent) Philip Andrewes (PC) 12226
Gladys Huffman (L) 9004
Barbara Mersereau (NDP) 2264
Ken Lee  1036

London Centre:

(incumbent) David Peterson (L) 13890	
Bill Rudd (PC) 6714
Peter Cassidy (NDP) 4340
Michelle McColm (F) 403

London North:

(incumbent) Ron Van Horne (L) 20536
George Auold (PC) 11433
Marion Boyd (NDP) 5191
Robert Smink (F) 566

London South:

Joan Smith (L) 24522
(incumbent) Gord Walker (PC) 17839
David Winninger (NDP) 5080
Robert Metz (F) 614

Middlesex:

Doug Reycraft (L) 11292
(incumbent) Bob Eaton (PC) 10482
Larry Green (NDP) 2169

Mississauga East:

(incumbent) Bud Gregory (PC) 14900
Victor Maida (L) 12334
Larry Taylor (NDP) 12015

Mississauga North:

Steve Offer (L) 21369
(incumbent) Terry Jones (PC) 19945
Sylvia Weylie (NDP) 9943

Mississauga South:

Margaret Marland (PC) 13186
Carolynne Siller (L) 11623
Barry Stevens (NDP) 4770

Muskoka:

(incumbent) Frank Miller (PC) 12723
Kenneth McClellan (L) 3036
Bob Maguire (NDP) 2836

Niagara Falls:

(incumbent) Vince Kerrio (L) 14658
Ted Salci (PC) 8616
Deloris Skilton (NDP) 6778

Nickel Belt:

(incumbent) Floyd Laughren (NDP) 8912
Evelyn Dutrisac (PC) 5849
Trudy Bolduc (L) 2255

Nipissing:

(incumbent) Mike Harris (PC) 14900
Mike Gauthier (L) 11002
Lynne Bennett (NDP) 3984

Northumberland:

(incumbent) Howard Sheppard (PC) 14296
Joan Fawcett (L) 12446
Judi Armstrong (NDP) 3247

Oakville:

Terry O'Connor (PC) 14265
Doug Carrothers (L) 13578
Kevin Flynn (NDP) 4390
Chris Kowalchuk (G) 2008

Oakwood:

(incumbent) Tony Grande (NDP) 10407
Joe Ricciuti (L) 9631
Harriet Wolman (PC) 4636
Mike Sterling (Comm) 327

Oriole:

Elinor Caplan (L) 17641
(incumbent) John Williams (PC) 13557
Lorne Strachan (NDP) 3660
George Graham (Lbt) 1106

Oshawa:

(incumbent) Mike Breaugh (NDP) 12686
Bob Boychyn (PC) 7528
Joe Neal (L) 5034

Ottawa Centre:

(incumbent) Evelyn Gigantes (NDP) 11890
Graham Bird (PC) 8005
Pat Legris (L) 7103
John Turmel  364

Ottawa East:

(incumbent) Bernard Grandmaitre (L) 14601
Kathryn Barnard (NDP) 3971
Paul St. Georges (PC) 2257
Serge Girard (politician)|Serge Girard  518	

Ottawa South:

(incumbent) Claude Bennett (PC) 12971
Andrew Caddell (L) 11634
John Smart (NDP) 8311

Ottawa West:

(incumbent) Reuben Baetz (PC) 15089
Alex Cullen (L) 12141
Greg Ross (NDP) 4427
Gregory Vezina (G) 701

Oxford:

(incumbent) Dick Treleaven (PC) 15507
Charlotte Sutherland (L) 10656
Wayne Colburn (NDP) 5660
Kaye Sargent (Lbt) 729
Rick Spurgeon  577

Parkdale:

(incumbent) Tony Ruprecht (L) 12065
Richard Gilbert (NDP) 5176
Tessie Jew (PC) 2052

Parry Sound:

(incumbent) Ernie Eves (PC) 10904
Richard Thomas (L) 9544
Leo Gagne (NDP) 1130

Perth:

(incumbent) Hugh Edighoffer (L) 20040
Glynn Coghlin (PC) 6076
Warren Ham (NDP) 2796

Peterborough:

(incumbent) John Turner (PC) 16878
Linda Slavin (NDP) 11941
Bill Ayotte (L) 9734
John Conlin (Lbt) 461
George K. Kerr (G) 212

Port Arthur:

(incumbent) Jim Foulds (NDP) 13084
Swede Johnson (PC) 9826
John Ranta (L) 6169

Prescott and Russell:

(incumbent) Jean Poirier (L) 18833
Guy Genier (PC) 11038
Maurice Landry (NDP) 2625

Prince Edward—Lennox:

(incumbent) James Taylor (PC) 10170
Gordon Mylks (L) 6918
Harry Plummer (NDP) 2307

Quinte:

(incumbent) Hugh O’Neil (L) 18988	
Neil Robertson (PC) 9287
Gene Morosan (NDP) 1817

Rainy River:

Jack Pierce (PC) 5053
Howard Hampton (NDP) 4775		
Ron King (L) 2944

Renfrew North:

(incumbent) Sean Conway (L) 12849
Bryan Hocking (PC) 5748
Robert Cottingham (NDP) 740

Renfrew South:

(incumbent) Paul Yakabuski (PC) 14182
Dermott Calver (L) 9687
Ish Theilheimer (NDP) 3420

Riverdale:

David Reville (NDP) 9869
Bret Snider (PC) 4590
Doug DeMille (L) 3949
Maggie Bizzell (Comm) 322
Michael Tegtmeyer (G) 192

St. Andrew—St. Patrick:

(incumbent) Larry Grossman (PC) 10332
Meg Griffiths (NDP) 8373
Jim DaCosta (L) 6330
Cathy Laurier (Comm) 264
Judy Hannon (G) 232

St. Catharines:

St. David:

Ian Scott (L) 13120
Julian Porter (PC) 9702
Barbara Hall (NDP) 4878
Earl Epstein (Lbt) 227

St. George:

(incumbent) Susan Fish (PC) 11378
Diana Hunt (NDP) 10543
Joseph Mifsud (L) 9361
Michael Beech (Lbt) 1007
Karol Siroky (Ind [New Tories]) 186

Sarnia:

(incumbent) Andy Brandt (PC) 18651
Michael Robb (L) 7438
Duncan Longwell (NDP) 3572
Margaret Coe (Lbt) 792

Sault Ste. Marie:

Karl Morin-Strom (NDP) 16362
(incumbent) Russ Ramsay (PC) 15293
Roy Youngson (L) 4830

Scarborough Centre:

William C. Davis (PC) 8890
Gerald Lennon (L) 8531
Barry Christensen (NDP) 7577

Scarborough East:

Ed Fulton (L) 15855
Verla Fiveash (PC) 11245
Alawi Mohideen (NDP) 4381
Jim McIntosh (Lbt) 1402

Scarborough—Ellesmere:

David Warner (NDP) 10119
(incumbent) Alan Robinson (PC) 9900
Carole Lidgold (L) 6674
George Dance (Lbt) 348

Scarborough North:

Alvin Curling (L) 30504		
Carole Noble (PC) 22644
Jerry Daca (NDP) 9072
R.J. Austin  1972

Scarborough West:

(incumbent) Richard Johnston (NDP) 12889
Kurt Christensen (PC) 5994
Anthony Judd (L) 4806
John MacMillan 544

Simcoe Centre:

Earl W. Rowe (PC) 15379
Ross Whiteside (L) 14845
Paul Wessenger (NDP) 9639
Steve Kaasgaard  566

Simcoe East:

(incumbent) Al McLean (PC) 13371
Fayne Bullen (NDP) 11002
George MacDonald (L) 7566

Stormont—Dundas—Glengarry & East Grenville:

(incumbent) Noble Villeneuve (PC) 13119	
Bill Dillabough (L) 7036
Rudi Derstroff (NDP) 1700

Sudbury:

(incumbent) Jim Gordon (PC) 12591
Ernie St-Jean (NDP) 7010
Chris Nash (L) 6302

Sudbury East:

(incumbent) Elie Martel (NDP) 17241
George McDonald (PC) 9576
Edelgard Mahant (L) 4726

Timiskaming:

David Ramsay (NDP) 10765
(incumbent) Ed Havrot (PC) 7941
Dale Woods (L) 2026
George Yeates  464

Victoria—Haliburton:

(incumbent) John Eakins (L) 15340
Murray Fearrey (PC) 11570
Art Field (NDP) 3209

Waterloo North:

(incumbent) Herbert Epp (L) 16458
Lynne Woolstencroft (PC) 9149
Richard Gerson (NDP) 4534

Welland—Thorold:

(incumbent) Mel Swart (NDP) 17065
Roy Smith (L) 6027
Ed Minchin (PC) 5618

Wellington—Dufferin—Peel:

(incumbent) Jack Johnson (PC) 14845
Bruce Whiteside (L) 10401
Sandy Young (NDP) 6395

Wellington South:

Rick Ferraro (L) 17995
Marilyn Robinson (PC) 12989
Derek Fletcher (NDP) 6641

Wentworth:

(incumbent) Gordon Dean (PC) 12322
June Peace (L) 10337
Sharon Lehnert (NDP) 8571
Albert Papazian  947

Wentworth North:

Chris Ward (L) 18328
(incumbent) Ann Sloat (PC) 13160
Lynn Spencer (NDP) 6158
George Grinnell (G) 751

Wilson Heights:

Monte Kwinter (L) 12363	
(incumbent) David Rotenberg (PC) 10175
Howard Moscoe (NDP) 7793

Windsor—Riverside:

(incumbent) Dave Cooke (NDP) 17883
Ron Burgoyne (PC) 6719
Ferguson Jenkins (L) 4418

Windsor—Sandwich:

(incumbent) Bill Wrye (L) 10730
Paul Forder (NDP) 7583
Ron Arkell (PC) 3681
Mike Longmoore (Comm) 197

Windsor—Walkerville:

(incumbent) Bernard Newman (L) 9130
Jane Boyd (PC) 6980
Gary Parent (NDP) 6698

York Centre:

(incumbent) Don Cousens (PC) 25022
Ron Maheu (L) 19776
Diane Meaghan (NDP) 7171
Stewart Cole  2644

York East:

(incumbent) Robert Elgie (PC) 11459
Gord Crann (NDP) 9183
Omar Chaudhery (L) 6629
Ed McDonald (Comm) 929
Kathy Sorensen (Lbt) 410

York Mills:

(incumbent) Bette Stephenson (PC) 17943
Gunnar Tannis (L) 10078
Gord Doctorow (NDP) 6872
Scott Bell (Lbt) 2339

York North:

Greg Sorbara (L) 21291
(incumbent) William Hodgson (PC) 17196
Keith Munro (NDP) 7026

York South:

(incumbent) Bob Rae (NDP) 16373	
Horace Hale (L) 6807
Toomas Dunapuu (PC) 5321
Paul Schulze  1063
Lucille Boikoff  402
Dusan Kubias (Lbt) 343

York West:

(incumbent) Nick Leluk (PC) 14595
Leonard Braithwaite (L) 13880
Phil Jones (NDP) 6980
Bob Dunk (Lbt) 1099

Yorkview:

Claudio Polsinelli (L) 15986
Mike Foster (NDP) 12658
Leslie Soobrian (PC) 3431

Post-election changes

York East (res. Robert Elgie, September 26, 1985), April 17, 1986:

Christine Hart (L) 9347
Gina Brannan (PC) 7956
Gord Crann (NDP) 7928
Jim McIntosh (Lbt) 243
John MacLennan (Comm) 100
Mark Adair (G) 60
John Turmel (SC) 44
Jack Arshawsky 27

Cochrane North (res. René Fontaine, 1986), August 14, 1986:

René Fontaine (L) 8463
Bertrand Proulx  766
Judy Cole  606
Graham McCready  185
Kaye Sargent (Lbt) 99
John Turmel  75

David Ramsay, elected as a New Democrat, joined the Liberal Party on October 6, 1986.  Tony Lupusella, also elected as a New Democrat, joined the Liberal Party on December 17, 1986.  After Lupusella's defection, the Liberals held as many seats in the legislative assembly as the Progressive Conservatives, at 51, (if the Speaker of the Legislature is included as a Liberal).

Paul Yakabuski, PC MPP for Renfrew South died July 31, 1987

See also

Politics of Ontario
List of Ontario political parties
Premier of Ontario
Leader of the Opposition (Ontario)
Independent candidates, 1985 Ontario provincial election

Notes
 Replaced as Premier by David Peterson on June 26, 1985

 Turmel ran as a "Social Credit Party of Ontario" candidate despite the fact that the party was long since defunct

References

Further reading
 
 

1985 elections in Canada
1985
1985 in Ontario
May 1985 events in Canada